Derek Stanley Clarke (1937-1997), is a male former athlete who competed for England.

Athletics career
Clarke was selected by England to represent his country in Athletics events. He was a two times National champion.

He represented England in the decathlon, at the 1966 British Empire and Commonwealth Games in Kingston, Jamaica.

He also competed in the 1966 European Athletics Championships – Men's decathlon.

References

1937 births
1997 deaths
English male athletes
Athletes (track and field) at the 1966 British Empire and Commonwealth Games
English decathletes
Commonwealth Games competitors for England